Heart of Dixie is the fifth mixtape by American rapper Yelawolf. It was released on July 4, 2012 as a free download from LiveMixtapes and DatPiff.com.

This mixtape sees Yelawolf reverting to his original style, as seen in his previous mixtapes. The mixtape was hosted by DJ Frank White and was entirely produced by M16. Incidentally, all three artists are from Alabama, which further coincides with the recurring theme of hometown pride in Yelawolf's music.

Track listing

References

External links
 Download Page no. 1
 Download Page no. 2

2012 mixtape albums
Yelawolf albums